Purkazi or Purquazi is a town and a nagar panchayat in Muzaffarnagar district in the Indian state of Uttar Pradesh. It is adjacent to the Uttarakhand state, connecting border of Haridwar district and Muzaffarnagar district. Zaheer Farooqui (Adv.) is the Nagar Panchayat Chairman of Purkazi.

Demographics
 India census, Purkazi has a population  of 27,516 which includes 14,332 males and 13,184 females. Children comprise 4,575 of the total population of Purkazi. The nagar panchayat has 13,244 illiterate people out of which 7,736 are males and 5,508 are females.

Location
Purkazi is located on NH 58, Delhi-Dehradun highway, 56 km from temple city of Haridwar.

Historical significance (Suli Wala Bagh) 
The Suli Wala Bagh located in Purkazi is the witness to the mass murder of 500 freedom fighters after the first war of independence in 1857, when the English collector ordered them to be hanged for disobeying British government rule. The citizens of Purkazi are demanding Suli wala Bagh to be declared as a National ‘Shaheed Sthal’. Thousands of people participated in a Tiranga Yatra under the leadership of Zaheer Farooqui on 15 August 2018.

Events
The Chairman Advocate Farooqui has organized the patriotic program "Ek Shaam Shaheedon Ke Naam" in Purkazi since 2017. On 23 March 2019, tributes were paid to the freedom fighters and the martyrs of Pulawama. The relatives of Shaheed Bhagat Singh, Vir Abdul Hamid, and the families of CRPF personnel who died in the Pulwama Terror attack attended, among others.

References

Cities and towns in Muzaffarnagar district